Valentin Chernikov (1 April 1937, Yerevan – 5 January 2002, Nizhny Novgorod) was a Soviet Olympic fencer. He won a bronze medal in the team épée event at the 1960 Summer Olympics. He also won the gold medal at the 1961 World Fencing Championships in the team épée.

References

1937 births
2002 deaths
Sportspeople from Yerevan
Soviet male fencers
Olympic fencers of the Soviet Union
Fencers at the 1956 Summer Olympics
Fencers at the 1960 Summer Olympics
Olympic bronze medalists for the Soviet Union
Olympic medalists in fencing
Medalists at the 1960 Summer Olympics